Grandad of Races is a 1950 American short documentary film about the Palio di Siena held in the Piazza del Campo in Siena, directed by André de la Varre. It won an Oscar at the 23rd Academy Awards in 1951 for Best Short Subject (One-Reel).

Cast
 Art Gilmore as Narrator

References

External links

1950 films
1950 documentary films
1950 short films
American horse racing films
1950s short documentary films
American short documentary films
Live Action Short Film Academy Award winners
Warner Bros. short films
Documentary films about horse racing
Documentary films about Italy
Siena
1950s English-language films
1950s American films